Baldwin's Wedding (Swedish:Baldevins bröllop) is a 1938 Swedish comedy film. The film was written by Edvard Persson and Gideon Wahlberg and directed by Emil A. Lingheim and Gideon Wahlberg.

Plot 
The film is about the dockworker Baldevin.

Cast 
 Edvard Persson – Baldevin
 Arthur Fischer – Sörensen
 Bullan Weijden – Ms. Sörensen
 Dagmar Ebbesen – Ms. Lisa Westman
 Björn Berglund – Johan
 John Ekman – Johnsson
 Elsa Sundgren – Astrid (Johnsson's daughter)
 Lisskulla Jobs – Sofi (Johnsson's maid)
 Tom Walter – Karlsson
 Alma Bodén
 Allan Waldner

References

External links 
 

Swedish comedy films
1938 films
1930s Swedish-language films
Swedish black-and-white films
Films set in Sweden
Sweden in fiction
1938 comedy films
Films directed by Emil A. Lingheim
Films directed by Gideon Wahlberg
1930s Swedish films